The Ministry of Foreign Affairs of Eritrea is a government ministry which oversees the foreign relations of Eritrea. Eritrea's current Minister of Foreign Affairs is Osman Saleh Mohammed, since 2007.

List of ministers
This is a list of Ministers of Foreign Affairs of Eritrea:

1993–1994: Mahmoud Ahmed Sherifo
1994–1997: Petros Solomon
1997–2000: Haile Woldense
2000–2005: Ali Said Abdella
2005–2007: Mohamed Omer (acting)
2007–present: Osman Saleh Mohammed

See also
Foreign aid to Eritrea
List of diplomatic missions of Eritrea
List of diplomatic missions in Eritrea

References

Government of Eritrea